Array Networks is an American networking hardware company. It sells network traffic encryption tools.

Array Networks was founded in 2000 by Lawrence Lu and is based in Milpitas, California. Originally called ClickArray Networks, it was renamed Array Networks in 2001 by then-incoming CEO Don Massaro who said the longer name "sounded too dot-commy". It received funding from the venture capital firm U.S. Venture Partners and the private equity firm H&Q Asia Pacific.

On May 13, 2009, Array Networks became the first non-Taiwan company to be listed on the Taiwan Stock Exchange. The company sold 54 million shares that had a total value of about $79 million. In 2009, 43% of the company's market share was in China, and its main product type sold there consisted of SSL VPN devices. It also had 200 employees in China, which CEO Michael Zhao said made China a "natural choice" for an IPO, In comparison, the company had 70 employees in Silicon Valley. but because China did not allow non-Chinese companies on their exchange, he narrowed the choices down to the NASDAQ and the Taiwan Stock Exchange. He chose the Taiwan Stock Exchange for two reasons: Array Networks had a strong business presence in Asia, and Taiwan Stock Exchange's listing fees were at least one third less than the NASDAQ's.

In 2011, CRN Magazine noted that most of Array Networks' sales is from Asia and that the company is "particularly strong" in China, Japan, and India.

In 2018, Array Networks was named to CIO Review's Top 10 Networking Companies of 2018.

Products

APV series application delivery controllers

In 2008, Array Networks first released its AppVelocity devices that consisted of application delivery controllers for SSL acceleration, load balancing and traffic managementat layers 2-7 for enterprise data centers and Web sites. Later devices were introduced in 2013, 2014, and 2015.

AG series VPN gateways
Array sells VPN gateways.

Remote Desktop Access
Array sells DesktopDirect which enables remote desktop access in a web browser.

Secure Mobile Access
Array sells MotionPro, a product for remote desktop access via personal mobile devices.

aCelera WAN optimization controller
In March 2013, Array acquired the assets of WOC pioneer Certeon, including development and support operations, and software-based WAN optimization products including the aCelera Virtual Appliance, aCelera for Windows Server and aCelera Mobile.
 
The aCelera appliance can be used to accelerate application traffic for Microsoft, Oracle, SAP, IBM, Dell, file transfers, backup and replication and others.

References

External links
 Official website

Companies based in Milpitas, California
Networking companies of the United States
Networking hardware companies
Technology companies established in 2001